Favorite Waltzes is a studio album by country music artist Hank Thompson and His Brazos Valley Boys. It was released in 1959 by Capitol Records (catalog no. T-1111).

In the annual poll by Billboard magazine of country music disc jockeys, Favorite Waltzes ranked as the No. 14 album of 1959.

AllMusic gave the album a rating of two-and-a-half stars. Reviewer Bruce Eder described it as "sort of a novelty album" and concluded: "Not Thompson's most exciting record, but it makes for pleasant enough listening, and the musicianship is very solid."

Track listing
Side A
 "Shenandoah Valley Waltz'
 "Wednesday Night Waltz"
 "Signed, Sealed and Delivered"
 "Skater's Waltz"
 "Warm Red Wine"
 "Fifty Year Ago Waltz"

Side B
 "In the Valley of the Moon"
 "La Zinda Waltz"
 "Let Me Call You Sweetheart"
 "The Anniversary Waltz"
 "What Will I Do on Monday"
 "Gold and Silver Waltz"

References

1959 albums
Hank Thompson (musician) albums
Capitol Records albums